Lincoln Alexander Public School may refer to:

Schools named after The Honourable Lincoln Alexander
Schools named in honour of Lincoln Alexander, former federal Member of Parliament, former federal cabinet minister, former Lieutenant Governor of Ontario.

Elementary schools
 Lincoln Alexander Public School in Ajax, Ontario, part of the Durham District School Board
 Lincoln Alexander Public School in Hamilton, Ontario, part of the Hamilton-Wentworth District School Board
 Lincoln Alexander Public School in Markham, Ontario part of the York Region District School Board

Other
Lincoln M. Alexander Secondary School in Mississauga, Ontario, part of the Peel District School Board